Samet Gündüz (born 13 September 1987) is a Swiss former professional footballer of Turkish descent who played as a midfielder.

Career
Gündüz came through the youth system at FC Concordia Basel before joining FC Basel in 2005. He scored eleven goals in sixty appearances for Basel's under-21 squad. During the 2008/09 season, he was loaned out to FC Wil, For Wil he played twelve games and scored one goal. Later in the season, he was loaned out to Concordia. There, he played eleven matches.

References

External links
 
 
 Profile at Swiss Football League Website 

1987 births
Living people
Swiss people of Turkish descent
Association football midfielders
Swiss men's footballers
FC Concordia Basel players
FC Basel players
FC Wil players
FC Thun players
Swiss Challenge League players